Trouble Days was recorded independently by Christian alternative rock band Seabird.  The album was released on July 16, 2013 and funded largely by $40,000 generated on Kickstarter.

Track listing

Personnel 
Aaron Morgan – vocals, keys, Tubular Bells, Background Vocals
Ryan Morgan – guitars
Chris Kubik – bass
Aaron Hunt – drums, Percussion, Background Vocals
Paul Moak -Guitars, B3 organ, Background Vocals
Meridith Oesting -Hammered Dulcimer, Background Vocals
Group Vocals -Natalie Morgan, Celeste Morgan, Christina VonHagel, Paul Moak, Devin (Grape Lady) Vaughan

Engineer:  Paul Moak at the Smoakstack
Assistand Engineers: Justin March and Devin Vaughan
Production Coordination: Lani Crump and Dave Steunebrink for Showdown Productions
Mix: Sean Moffitt at Pinstrip Studios
Mis Assistant: Warren David
Mastering: Dave McNair at Dave McNair Mastering
Design: Matthew Dugger
Photographer:  John Willis

References

facebook.com/seabird

2013 albums
Seabird (band) albums